Rapid Run is a tributary of Buffalo Creek in Centre County and Union County in Pennsylvania, in the United States. Some streams in the watershed are impacted by nutrients, sediment, E. coli, and thermal radiation and one unnamed tributary is designated as an impaired waterbody. Rapid Run is a freestone mountain stream in the ridge and valley physiographic province. It flows through a lake known as Halfway Lake and also passes through the Rapid Run Gap.

Rapid Run is one of the major tributaries of Buffalo Creek. Its watershed is mostly forested, but there is some agricultural land and impervious surfaces as well. Pennsylvania Route 192 runs alongside the stream for much of its length. A number of bridges have been constructed across the stream. The drainage basin is designated as a High-Quality Coldwater Fishery and a Migratory Fishery. Additionally, a reach of Rapid Run is Class A Wild Trout Waters. Various eels and freshwater sponges have also been observed in the stream. Rapid Run flows through Bald Eagle State Forest, R.B. Winter State Park, and Sand Bridge State Park.

Course

Rapid Run begins in a valley in Miles Township, Centre County. It flows in a generally east-northeasterly direction for a few miles and receives the tributary Yankee Run from the left before entering Hartley Township, Union County. In this township, the stream crosses Pennsylvania Route 192 and passes by a spring called The Little Bubbler. The stream then turns south-southeast, passing through Halfway Lake, where it receives the tributary Halfway Run from the left. From the southern end of the lake, it continues flowing south-southeast, crossing Pennsylvania Route 192 again and entering a considerably narrower valley that it shares with Route 192. It passes by Bake Oven Mountain and Seven Notch Mountain for several tenths of a mile before turning east-northeast to stay in the valley.

After more than a mile, Rapid Run enters Lewis Township, Union County. Here it continues flowing east in its valley, alongside Pennsylvania Route 192 and Jones Mountain. The stream crosses Pennsylvania Route 192 twice and spends several miles in Lewis Township before entering West Buffalo Township. In West Buffalo Township, it continues heading east for more than a mile before crossing Pennsylvania Route 192 one last time and turning east-southeast. The stream then leaves its narrow valley and flows alongside a much shallower, broader one that it shares with Stony Run. After a few miles, it enters Buffalo Township, where it continues flowing southeast. After several tenths of a mile (about 0.5 km), it reaches its confluence with Buffalo Creek.

Tributaries
Rapid Run has two named tributaries: Yankee Run and Halfway Run.

Hydrology
The cause of the impairment is nutrients and siltation. The source of the impairment is grazing-related agriculture. The total maximum daily load date is 2015. In addition to nutrients and sediment, the watershed is impacted by E. coli and thermal radiation.

In 2000,  of sediment came from streambank erosion,  came from row crops,  came from low-density urban land,  came from hay and pastures, and  came from unpaved roads. Other sources contributed  of sediment.

In 2000,  of nitrogen came from groundwater/subsurface,  came from row crops,  came from hay and pastures,  came from low-density urban land, and  came from septic systems.  came from unpaved roads,  came from streambank erosion, and  came from miscellaneous sources.

In 2000, groundwater/subsurface contributed  of phosphorus to the stream, row crops contributed , and hay/pastures contributed . Low-density urban land contributed , septic systems contributed , streambank erosion contributed , and unpaved roads contributed .  of phosphorus came from miscellaneous sources.

Geography, geology, and climate

Rapid Run is a mountain stream.

A lake known as Halfway Lake is located on Rapid Run. The lake has a sandstone dam. Rapid Run is a freestone stream in the ridge and valley physiographic province.

Upstream of Halfway Lake, Rapid Run flows through a valley known as Brush Valley. Downstream of the lake, it exits this valley through a deep water gap. The Rapid Run Gorge is located in the watershed of Rapid Run, just south of Halfway Lake. In the gorge, all five of the rock formations that make up the area's mountains occur: the Reedsville Formation, the Bald Eagle Formation, the Juniata Formation, the Tuscarora Formation, and the Rose Hill Formation.

In the water gap of Rapid Run, a number of sedimentary rock formations are exposed along Pennsylvania Route 192. These rock formations mainly consist of shales, sandstones, and conglomeratic sandstones that date to the Ordivician and Silurian periods. The strata in the stream's water gap are all inclined to the southeast. There also used to be an ice-dammed lake near the stream.

However, in the distant past, a right-angle tributary of Rapid Run (which at the time was confined to the Fourteenmile Narrows) cut its way back from near Seven Notch Mountain and "beheaded" the upper reaches of Elk Creek, causing the headwaters of Elk Creek to flow into Rapid Run. The capture of the headwaters of Elk Creek by Rapid Run occurred approximately one million years ago and has been described as a "blatant act of 'stream piracy'".

A 315-foot segment of Rapid Run contains 27 percent riffles, 33 percent runs, and 40 percent pools. Further downstream, a 340-foot segment of the stream contains 35 percent riffles, 31 percent runs, and 34 percent pools. Still further downstream, a 635-foot segment contains 25 percent riffles, 21 percent runs, and 54 percent pools.

Watershed

The mouth of the stream is in the United States Geological Survey quadrangle of Mifflinburg. However, its source is in the quadrangle of Hartleton. The stream is one of the major tributaries to Buffalo Creek. Its watershed makes up 14 percent of the Buffalo Creek drainage basin.

A total of 88 percent of the watershed of Rapid Run is on forested land. Another 7 percent is on agricultural land and 2 percent is on impervious surfaces. However, the portion of land on impervious surfaces could rise to 7 percent in the future. The only part of the watershed where agricultural land is predominant is the area in the vicinity of the stream's impaired tributary. The main stem and all of its other tributaries are on forested land.

The watershed contains  of unpaved roads. The headwaters of the stream are in a swampy area.

Pennsylvania Route 192 runs alongside Rapid run for much of its length. For this reason, access to the stream is easy.

History

Rapid Run was entered into the Geographic Names Information System on August 2, 1979. Its identifier in the Geographic Names Information System is 1193170. The stream is also known as Yankee Run. This name appears in Place Names of Centre County Pennsylvania: A Geographical Analysis, which was published in 1969.

Daniel Reish of Berks County, Pennsylvania settled in the vicinity of Rapid Run in Forest Hill in 1820 and constructed a sawmill, gristmill, and distillery. In the 1920s and 1930s, some people used dynamite to capture fish in Rapid Run. When the logging industry in the area was active, a log dam and a sawmill were constructed on the stream where Halfway Lake currently is. The first stone dam ever built by the Civilian Conservation Corps impounds Halfway Lake on Rapid Run.

A bridge carrying T-400 over Rapid Run was built in 1916 and repaired in 1954. A bridge carrying T-383/Walbash Road was built over the stream at End of Narrows in 1935 and repaired in 1958. Another bridge carrying Pennsylvania Route 192 was constructed across the stream in 1936. Three more bridges carrying that highway were built in 1938 and 1939 and repaired in 1986 and 1987. A bridge carrying State Route 3009 was built across the stream northwest of Cowan in 1973 and another bridge carrying that road was built over Rapid Run in Cowan in 1994.

The Pennsylvania American Water Company historically owned lands along Rapid Run and considered using the stream as a water supply. However, they eventually sold the land. In a 2008 report, the watershed of Rapid Run was ranked fifth amongst sub-watersheds in the Buffalo Creek drainage basin for restoration priority.

Biology
The drainage basin of Rapid Run is designated as a High-Quality Coldwater Fishery and a Migratory Fishery. Wild trout naturally reproduce in the stream from its headwaters downstream to its mouth. Brook trout also inhabit the stream. It has also been stocked with fish.

Rapid Run has a population of benthic macroinvertebrates that has been described as "healthy". Additionally, a freshwater sponge known as Spongilla fragilis has been observed in the stream, but only near the Halfway Dam. It is likely that physical factors, as opposed to chemical ones, restrict their range.

There is a second-growth forest consisting mainly of pine and hemlock. The forest has been described as "pristine".

The monthly pathogen load in Rapid Run is 5.907 × 1015 organisms per month. Urban areas contribute 5.579 × 1015 organisms per month and farm animals contribute 3.210 × 1014 organisms per month. Wildlife contributes 3.713 × 1015 organisms per month and septic systems contribute 3.704 × 1015.

Recreation
Rapid Run has been described as a "high quality" stream with "excellent" angling opportunities. The headwaters of the stream are in Bald Eagle State Forest. A reach of it is in R.B. Winter State Park and another reach is in Sand Bridge State Park. A hiking trail in the latter park also crosses the stream.

According to Mike Sanja's 1988 book Pennsylvania Trout & Salmon Fishing Guide, the best fishing on Rapid Run is in its lower .

See also
 Stony Run (Buffalo Creek), next tributary of Buffalo Creek going downstream
 North Branch Buffalo Creek, next tributary of Buffalo Creek going upstream
 List of rivers of Pennsylvania

References

External links

Rivers of Centre County, Pennsylvania
Rivers of Union County, Pennsylvania
Tributaries of Buffalo Creek (West Branch Susquehanna River)
Rivers of Pennsylvania